Tonica is a genus of moths of the family Depressariidae.

Species
 Tonica argessa Diakonoff, 1967
 Tonica barrowi Bingham, 1907
 Tonica centroluta Diakonoff, 1966
 Tonica citrantha Diakonoff, 1967
 Tonica cyanodoxa Meyrick, 1924
 Tonica effractella Snellen, 1879
 Tonica gypsopis Meyrick, 1928
 Tonica lagaropis Meyrick, 1928
 Tonica malthacodes Meyrick, 1914
 Tonica melanoglypha Diakonoff, 1966
 Tonica mixogama Meyrick, 1928
 Tonica nigricostella Snellen, 1901
 Tonica nigrimarginata Diakonoff, 1954
 Tonica niviferana Walker, 1864
 Tonica peripsacas Diakonoff, 1966
 Tonica pharmacis Diakonoff, 1966
 Tonica senescens Meyrick, 1910
 Tonica syngnoma Diakonoff, 1966
 Tonica terasella Walker, 1864

References

Depressariinae
Tonica